Ophiogomphus smithi, known generally as Sioux snaketail, is a species of clubtail in the family of dragonflies known as Gomphidae. Other common names include the yellow-rayed lasthenium and sand snaketail. It is found in North America.

The IUCN conservation status of Ophiogomphus smithi is "LC", least concern, with no immediate threat to the species' survival. The population is stable.

References

Further reading

 
 

Ophiogomphus
Articles created by Qbugbot
Insects described in 2004